This is a list of the municipalities in the state of Rio Grande do Sul (RS), located in the South Region of Brazil. Rio Grande do Sul is divided into 497 municipalities, which are grouped into 35 microregions, which are grouped into 7 mesoregions.

See also
Geography of Brazil

Rio Grande do Sul